Eagleport is an unincorporated community in Morgan County, in the U.S. state of Ohio.

History
Eagleport was laid out in 1837. A post office called Eagleport was established in 1873, and remained in operation until 1955.

References

Unincorporated communities in Morgan County, Ohio
Unincorporated communities in Ohio
1837 establishments in Ohio